Pyyvesi is a medium-sized lake of South Savonia region in Finland. It belongs to Vuoksi main catchment area.

See also
List of lakes in Finland

References

Nature of Savonlinna